Tigr may refer to:
 TIGR, an Italian anti-Fascist insurgent organization, active in the 1920 and 1930s
 Tigr (Russian military vehicle), a Russian high-mobility multi-purpose military vehicle 
 The Institute for Genomic Research (TIGR), now a part of the J. Craig Venter Institute
 Trabecular meshwork inducible glucocorticoid response or MYOC, a human gene

See also
 Tigre (disambiguation)